Xanthophytum is a genus of flowering plants in the family Rubiaceae. The genus is found from tropical and subtropical Asia to the southwestern Pacific.

Species

 Xanthophytum alopecurum Axelius
 Xanthophytum attopevense (Pierre ex Pit.) H.S.Lo
 Xanthophytum balansae (Pit.) H.S.Lo
 Xanthophytum borneense (Valeton) Axelius
 Xanthophytum brookei Axelius
 Xanthophytum bullatum Tange
 Xanthophytum calycinum (A.Gray) Benth. & Hook.f. ex Drake
 Xanthophytum capitatum Valeton
 Xanthophytum capitellatum Ridl.
 Xanthophytum cylindricum Axelius
 Xanthophytum ferrugineum (DC.) Merr.
 Xanthophytum foliaceum Axelius
 Xanthophytum fruticulosum Reinw. ex Blume
 Xanthophytum glabrum Axelius
 Xanthophytum glomeratum Valeton ex Bakh.f.
 Xanthophytum grandiflorum Axelius
 Xanthophytum grandifolium Valeton ex Bakh.f.
 Xanthophytum involucratum Merr.
 Xanthophytum johannis-winkleri Merr.
 Xanthophytum kinabaluense (Bremek.) Tange
 Xanthophytum kwangtungense (Chun & F.C.How) H.S.Lo
 Xanthophytum longipedunculatum Merr.
 Xanthophytum magnisepalum Axelius
 Xanthophytum minus Axelius
 Xanthophytum nitens Axelius
 Xanthophytum olivaceum Merr.
 Xanthophytum papuanum Wernham
 Xanthophytum polyanthum Pit.
 Xanthophytum pubistylosum Axelius
 Xanthophytum semiorbiculare (Bakh.f.) Axelius
 Xanthophytum sessile Axelius
 Xanthophytum setosum Axelius

References

Rubiaceae genera
Ophiorrhizeae